Baeguisa was a far-right, anti-communist, and fascist organization formed among young North Korean defectors in South Korea in 1945.

History
A group that was a precursor to the Baeguisa was the Daedongdan, who is famous for the 1945 assassination of Hyun jun hyuk, who was the head of committee for South Pyongan Province of the Communist Party of Korea. Yeom Dong-jin (then as Yeom Eung-Taik) and Baik kwan ok were members of this group and had to defect to South Korea because of the assassination attempt.
The group Baeguisa was formed in November 1945 in Seoul and publicly conducted terrorist activities against communism. The name of the group was inspired from the Blue Shirts Society, a secret ultranationalist fascist faction in the Kuomintang in China.  During the Korean War most of the group was absorbed into the Korea Liaison Office (KLO). The group used the name white shirt to represent the Korean tradition of wearing white clothes.

Notable activities

Espionage activities
The group trained a lot of spies to send to North Korea and participated in movements against land reforms, anti trusteeship activism, and collection of major figures in North Korea.

Assassination attempts
The group's activities were revealed through the report by United States Major George E.Cilley who worked for the Counterintelligence Corps (CIC). The report was written right after the assassination of South Korean politician Kim Gu and the report was open to the world in 2002.

North Korea
The group worked with Sin Ik-hui in attempted assassinations of Kim Il-sung on 1 March 1946, Choe Yong-gon on 5 March, Kim Chaek on 9 March 1946, and Kang Ryang-uk on 12 March 1946.

South Korea
The group famously assassinated Lyuh Woon-hyung in 1947.

American funding
The group was funded by the American Counterintelligence Corps (CIC).

References

Fascism in Asia
Far-right politics in South Korea
Terrorism in South Korea
1940s in Korea